The 2008 Vallelunga Superleague Formula round was the fifth round of the inaugural Superleague Formula championship, with the races taking place on November 2, 2008. Eighteen football teams were represented on the grid, the same number of teams as there was at the previous three rounds. There were two driver changes before this round of the championship and one during the round: Duncan Tappy returned to the Tottenham Hotspur cockpit replacing Dominik Jackson, having missed the previous round in Portugal and Kasper Andersen was replaced by Stamatis Katsimis in the Olympiacos CFP car. Having broken a bone in his right hand in practice, Paul Meijer was replaced by Dominick Muermans in the Al Ain car  – becoming their fourth driver in five races. The meeting saw a third win for championship leaders Beijing Guoan and a first win for F.C. Porto. Beijing also extended their championship lead to an almost unassailable 59 points.

Report

Qualifying
After the random draw which split the eighteen-car field into two groups, the fastest four qualifiers from each progressed into the knockout stages to decide places 1 to 8 on the grid. Andy Soucek (Atlético Madrid) missed out on the top eight, despite setting a time some 0.052 seconds faster than Group B 4th Adrián Vallés in the Liverpool F.C. car. As fastest drivers in their groups, Antônio Pizzonia (SC Corinthians) and Davide Rigon (Beijing Guoan) were expected to meet in the final, but neither made the final. Instead, Vallés and Robert Doornbos (A.C. Milan) battled it out, with Vallés coming out on top by 0.260 seconds – the fifth different polesitter in five races.

Race 1
Before the race even began, there was dramas - Borja García (Sevilla FC) started from pit lane and Alessandro Pier Guidi (Galatasaray S.K.) having gearbox troubles on the grid. At the start, Vallés led away from Doornbos and Rigon, with Pier Guidi passing Tuka Rocha (CR Flamengo) for fourth on the opening lap. Lap three saw the end of Enrico Toccacelo's Borussia Dortmund car with suspension failure while running towards the back. The top ten somehow stayed in order, until the pit window. Rigon pitted first followed by Rocha, Franck Perera (A.S. Roma) and Yelmer Buurman (PSV Eindhoven. Doornbos and Vallés pitted on lap 11, allowing Pier Guidi to lead for two laps before his pit stop. Pizzonia took the lead for a lap until he pitted, and after the cycle through, Rigon led from Doornbos, Pier Guidi, Vallés and Rocha. Lap 16 saw Garcia's race end with a stuck throttle. There was a somewhat crazy finish to the race, with Soucek and Perera both retiring within the last five minutes of the race with engine problems and a puncture respectively. Vallés suffered fuel pressure problems towards the end, falling five places in as many minutes as Rigon went on to claim his third victory of the season, opening up a 67-point lead over PSV. Following him home were Doornbos, Pier Guidi, Rocha, Ryan Dalziel (Rangers F.C., Pizzonia, Craig Dolby (R.S.C. Anderlecht), Tristan Gommendy (F.C. Porto), Vallés, Buurman, Duncan Tappy (Tottenham Hotspur), Max Wissel (FC Basel 1893), Stamatis Katsimis (Olympiacos CFP) and Dominick Muermans (Al Ain) – both rookies finishing a lap down.

Race 2
Race two began with a bang – a first corner incident taking out Pizzonia, Doornbos and Rocha at Curva Cimini, causing a long safety car period. Wissel retired the Basel car during this with engine trouble. All was cleared up for the restart on lap six with Toccacelo still leading from Soucek (up from third) and García. A brave move from Soucek at Campagnano moved the Spaniard into the lead with Perera passing García for third. Lap nine saw another accident, this time between Toccacelo and Perera again at Cimini. Toccacelo defended the inside line before moving sharply to the outside where Perera already was. Soucek pitted from the lead on lap eleven, but gremlins struck causing him to pit again, before retiring with gearbox trouble on lap 21. Katsimis led for a lap before he pitted, letting Tappy lead until his pitstop on lap 15. Perera took the lead, having pitted on lap eleven. A mistake from Buurman on lap 17 allowed Gommendy into second and after Perera. García retired again, with brake failure continuing Sevilla's spiral down the championship standings. The number of runners fell into single-figures on lap 27 with another three-car accident with Katsimis, Tappy and Pier Guidi crashing at Cimini. The race wasn't decided until the final lap when Perera made a slight mistake at Curva Soratte, allowing Gommendy through to win by 1.482 seconds from Perera, with Buurman, Vallés, Rigon, Dolby, Dalziel and Muermans completing the finishers. In the championship standings, Beijing had their lead cut to 59 points, which meant that a maximum of 42 points required for championship glory.

Results

Qualifying
 In each group, the top four qualify for the quarter-finals.

Group A

Group B

Knockout stages

Grid

Race 1

Race 2

References

External links
 Official results from the Superleague Formula website

Valleunga
Superleague Formula